James Carrell may refer to:
 James B. Carrell (born 1940), American and Canadian mathematician
 James P. Carrell (1787–1854), minister, singing teacher, composer and songbook compiler